The 1986 UAP Men's World Open Squash Championship is the men's edition of the 1986 World Open, which serves as the individual world championship for squash players. The event took place in Toulouse in France from 5 November to 11 November 1986. Ross Norman won his first World Open title, defeating Jahangir Khan in the final.

Seeds

Draw and results

Note
Jahangir Khan suffered defeat in the World Open for the first time since 1980. The world number one had previously won five consecutive world titles.

See also
PSA World Open

References

External links
World Squash History

M
World Squash Championships
Squash tournaments in France
Men's World Open Squash Championship
International sports competitions hosted by France
Men's World Open Squash Championship